The 1980 WAFL season was the 96th season of the West Australian Football League in its various incarnations.

The season saw the league drop the word ‘national’ from its official name for the first time in fifty years, reverting to the title in use from 1908 to 1930. It also saw reigning premiers East Fremantle embark on the most rapid slide by any reigning premier since  went from first to last in 1916. Handicapped by the loss of Mario Turco to North Melbourne and Doug Green to retirement, along with injuries to Jim Sewell, Graham Carter, Swan Districts recruit Mark Olsen and Rod Lester-Smith and form lapses by Tony Buhagiar and Ian Thomson, the blue and whites also lost classy Essendon recruit Darren “Daisy” Williams who returned to Victoria for personal reasons after two matches. Old Easts were to win only five matches all season, and were in danger of their first wooden spoon for eighty-two years before a win in their penultimate game put them safely ahead of Subiaco, who had another disastrous season plagued by financial problems whereby calls to “Save Subi” were opposed by calls from opponents to “Flog Subi”, leading to the worst record by any WA(N)FL club for twelve seasons.

In contrast,  had the best start to a WAFL season for twenty-one years, winning their first thirteen matches and gaining a $2000 bonus from Marlboro for winning their first twelve – with a further $200 if they could achieve a perfect home-and-away season. Swans were overpowered at the “business end” by the Mal Brown-coached , who were unbeaten apart from a five-game slump between the fifth and ninth rounds. The Bulldogs’ play late in the season is regarded as some of the finest ever seen in the WAFL, a claim substantiated by their thrashing top VFL club Carlton by 91 points in Escort Championships during March – easily the biggest win by a non-VFL club therein and in fact the biggest loss by a VFL club until the AFC Night Series was restricted thereto. The win over Carlton was impressive due to the fact that Carlton fielded their Premiership team from 1979 and South Fremantle had many young reserve players in their team like Wayne Henwood , Daryl Stokes, John Townsend and others. Brad Hardie was only 16 years old.

Home-and-away season

Round 1 (Easter weekend)

Round 2

Round 3

Round 4

Round 5

Round 6

Round 7

Round 8

Round 9 (Foundation Day)

Round 10

Round 11

Round 12

Round 13

Round 14

Round 15

Round 16

Round 17

Round 18

Round 19

Round 20

Round 21

Ladder

Finals

First semi-final

Second semi-final

Preliminary final

Grand final

Notes
The game when Austin Robertson kicked 15.11 (101).

References

External links
Official WAFL website
Australian Football: WAFL Season 1980

West Australian Football League seasons
WAFL